Bel's Boys is a British children's television series based on the band of the same name. The series consisted of 26 episodes and first aired on ITV in 2006 and later repeated on CITV.

The series was produced by Initial (part of the Endemol group) and was part funded by the NIFTC (Northern Ireland Film and Television Commission).  The series was filmed entirely in Belfast making it the biggest drama series ever to be filmed in Northern Ireland.

Overview 
The show stars Graham McKee, Luke O'Reilly and Eoin Logan from the real life "band" as Vince, Leon and Tay who send their demo cd to acting manager Ainsley Barter who, being an acting manager, not a band manager, tosses it in the bin. But his 9-year-old daughter, Bel Allanah Scully, listens to it and is instantly a fan. She goes round to their garage where they practice and hang out. Although they are uncertain at first about having a 9-year-old being their manager but she convinces them that the only way for them to get noticed by her dad is to first be managed by herself. In order to get them known they often enlist the help of Ainsley's PA, SJ, her younger brother, Ollie and Bel's best friend, Carina, although her friendship with Bel is often strained by her commitment to the band.

Episodes 
Season 1 and 2

Cast 
Vince-Graham McKee

Leon-Luke O'Reilly

Tay-Eoin Logan

Bel Barter-Allanah Scully

SJ-Dorothy Cotter

Ollie-Leo McGuigan

Carina-Lara McIvor

Ainsley Barter-Paddy Jenkins

Max-Robert Sheehan

External links   	 
Bel's Boys  at itv.com/citv

2006 British television series debuts
ITV children's television shows
Television series by Endemol
2000s British children's television series
2006 British television series endings
2000s British music television series